French Cabin Mountain is a triple-peak mountain located in Kittitas County of Washington state. The highest summit is West Peak, elevation 5,724-feet, the South Peak is 5,560-feet-elevation, and the North Peak is 5,498-feet. French Cabin Mountain is situated six miles north of Easton, between Kachess Lake and Cle Elum Lake, on land managed by Okanogan-Wenatchee National Forest. Precipitation runoff from the mountain drains north into French Cabin Creek and south into Silver Creek, which are both part of the Yakima River drainage basin. French Cabin Mountain is the toponym officially adopted by the U.S. Board on Geographic Names, however "Frenchman Mountain" is a variant. West Peak is also an official toponym.

Climate

Lying east of the Cascade crest, the area around French Cabin Mountain is a bit drier than areas to the west. Summers can bring warm temperatures and occasional thunderstorms. Most weather fronts originate in the Pacific Ocean, and travel east toward the Cascade Mountains. As fronts approach, they are forced upward by the peaks of the Cascade Range (Orographic lift), causing them to drop their moisture in the form of rain or snowfall onto the Cascades. As a result, the eastern slopes of the Cascades experience lower precipitation than the western slopes. During winter months, weather is usually cloudy, but due to high pressure systems over the Pacific Ocean that intensify during summer months, there is often little or no cloud cover during the summer.

See also

 Geology of the Pacific Northwest

Gallery

References

External links
 French Cabin Mountain: Weather forecast
 French Cabin Mountain: Washington Trails Association

Mountains of Kittitas County, Washington
Mountains of Washington (state)
Wenatchee National Forest
Cascade Range
North American 1000 m summits